Eric Yamamoto (publishing as Eric K. Yamamoto), the Korematsu Professor of Law and Social Justice at the William S. Richardson School of Law at the University of Hawaiʻi at Mānoa, is an internationally recognized expert on issues of racial justice, including racial reconciliation and redress. Flowing from the landmark 1944 Korematsu v. United States case, he is known for his work as a member of Fred Korematsu's 1983 legal team that succeeded in having Korematsu's original conviction overturned.

Background
After graduating from the University of Hawaiʻi at Mānoa in 1975, Yamamoto earned his Juris Doctor from the University of California Berkeley, School of Law in 1978.

Advocacy

Yamamoto worked on Korematsu v. United States, a landmark United States Supreme Court case that challenged the constitutionality of Executive Order 9066 during World War II which led to the internment of 120,000 Japanese Americans from California, the Pacific Northwest, and the Territory of Alaska. As a member of Fred Korematsu's legal team, Yamamoto provided co-counsel for his 1983 coram nobis petition, successfully challenging the constitutionality of his conviction for resisting internment, resulting in Korematsu's original conviction being overturned.

Scholarship
Among his other writings, Yamamoto is the award-winning author and coauthor of two books:

Interracial Justice: Conflict and Reconciliation In Post-Civil Rights America
Race, Rights, and Reparation: Law and the Japanese American Internment

As well as the sole author of one book about the Korematsu case:

In the Shadow of Korematsu (2018)

Awards
In 2012, the Consortium of Asian-American Law Professors created a national award in Yamamoto's name, "The Professor Eric Y. Yamamoto Emerging Scholar Award," in recognition of his "exemplary scholarship in racial justice and inspiration to emerging scholars." The award is to be granted annually to a United States law professor that is early in career who demonstrates outstanding promise.

In 2006, the Society of American Law Teachers (SALT) awarded Yamamoto its national "Great Teacher Award," awarded annually, in recognition of both his "teaching of social justice" and for "expanding access to justice."

External links
Eric Yamamoto
Korematsu Institute

References

Year of birth missing (living people)
Living people
University of Hawaiʻi faculty
University of Hawaiʻi at Mānoa alumni
UC Berkeley School of Law alumni
Hawaii lawyers
American legal scholars
American legal writers
American academics of Japanese descent
Japanese-American civil rights activists
Internment of Japanese Americans
William S. Richardson School of Law faculty
Writers from Honolulu